Two Wise Maids is a 1937 American drama film directed by Phil Rosen, written by Samuel Ornitz, and starring Alison Skipworth, Polly Moran, Irene Manning, Donald Cook, Jackie Searl, and Lila Lee. It was released on February 15, 1937, by Republic Pictures.

Plot

Cast

References

External links
 

1937 films
American drama films
1937 drama films
Republic Pictures films
Films directed by Phil Rosen
American black-and-white films
Films produced by Nat Levine
Films scored by Karl Hajos
1930s English-language films
1930s American films